A passport is a travel document issued by a government to a citizen of that country. The purpose of this document is to allow entry back into the home country, as well as access into other countries around the world by providing legal proof of identity and citizenship. Misusing a passport is a crime in many jurisdictions.

China

The Passport Law of the People’s Republic of China, adopted in 2006, prohibits applying for a passport fraudulently. It provides that fraudulently obtained passports are null and void and that "the holder of the passport shall be fined not less than RMB 2,000 yuan but not more than 5,000 yuan".

United States 

Passport fraud is a federal crime. Usually, this crime is committed to facilitate another crime such as, illegal immigration, contraband smuggling, economic crime, or terrorism. The US department of state's law enforcement, Diplomatic Security Service, have special agents who work with law enforcement agencies in over 160 countries all over the world to investigate passport fraud. Millions of stolen passports are used by terrorists and other dangerous criminals at any given time and it is considered the single largest threat to U.S. national security.

Committing the crime

Passport fraud is usually committed by: 
 Stealing the identity of a deceased person to use their passport 
 Using false documents; i.e. fake birth certificate
 Using stolen or modified passports, such as altering the photo I.D portion of an old passport
 Circumventing the parent signatures required for the passport of a person 16 years or younger

Violations

Possible violations of the following statutes are investigated by the United States Diplomatic Security Service:

18 U.S.C. 1541 Issuance Without Authority
18 U.S.C. 1542 False Statement in Application and Use of Passport 
18 U.S.C. 1543    Forgery or False Use of Passport
18 U.S.C. 1544 Misuse of Passport 
18 U.S.C. 1546 Fraud and Misuse of Visas, Permits, and Other Documents 
18 U.S.C. 371 Conspiracy to Commit Offense or to Defraud the United States 
18 U.S.C. 911 False Claim to Citizenship 
18 U.S.C. 1028 Fraud and Related Activity in Connection with Identification Documents and Information

Statutes do not specify that the passport must be a US passport.

Conviction

If a person lied on a passport application form, they can be fined up to $250,000 and sentenced up to 10 years in prison. 
If the crime includes human trafficking, narcotics, or both, the sentencing can be raised up to 15 years in prison. 
If terrorism is involved, the penalty can be raised to 20 years in prison.
As well as being charged with further penalties, if the person is caught engaging in any of these additional illegal activities.

See also
Brian Kim (hedge fund manager)
Charles Stopford
Identity document forgery

References

Fraud